Salem Metro is the proposed Metro system for the city of Salem, Tamil Nadu, part of a major expansion of public transport in the city. As Salem city is one of the developed city in Tamilnadu.

Overview 
As the monorail market is estimated to be ₹72,000 crore (US$10 billion) in India, the then Governor of Tamil Nadu, Banwarilal Brohit announced in Legislative assembly that the Government of Tamil Nadu has decided to do a feasibility study for introducing monorail system in Salem along with, Trichy, Madurai and Tirunelveli.

Project Timeline 
2011: Central Government announces metro rail projects for Tier II cities.
2011: Tamil Nadu Government under CM J. Jayalalithaa shelves the metro rail project in favour of monorail.
2021: In June 22 Tamil Nadu Governor announces that feasibility study would be conducted and Detailed Project Report (DPR) will be prepared for Salem Metro by Chennai Metro Rail Limited (CMRL).
2022: March 21 CMRL floats tender for Salem Metro's DPR and feasibility report preparation.
2022: July 9 Aarvee Associates wins bids for feasibility studies on Salem MRTS Project for 38 crores.

Cost 
The government has earmarked a sum of about ₹60,000 crore (US$8.4 billion) for metro and monorail projects in Tamil Nadu.

Network 
A faculty member from SASTRA, using Geographical Information System (GIS) tools, had worked out a proposal for a suburban railway route linking the Dr. M.G.R Central bus stand to Old bus stand.

Old bus stand   to    Dr. M.G.R Central bus stand

Hastampatti   to    Ammapettai

Anna park    to    Dr. M.G.R Central bus stand

Gandhi stadium    to     Hastampatti

Salem junction    to  Dr .M.G.R Central bus stand

Salem town   to   Salem junction

References

Transport in Salem, Tamil Nadu
Proposed monorails in India